Alain Beaulé (born April 7, 1946) is a Canadian retired professional ice hockey defenceman who played 183 games in the World Hockey Association for the Winnipeg Jets and Quebec Nordiques.

External links

1946 births
Canadian ice hockey defencemen
Quebec Nordiques (WHA) players
Winnipeg Jets (WHA) players
Ice hockey people from Quebec
Living people